Robert Selby Nesbit Gilchrist (1821 – 9 February 1905) was a Scottish first-class cricketer.

Gilchrist was born at Leith in Midlothian during 1821. He later made a single appearance in first-class cricket for the Gentlemen of Middlesex against the Gentlemen of England at Islington in 1865. Batting twice in the match, he was run out in the Gentlemen of Middlesex's first-innings without scoring, while in their second-innings he was again run out, having scored 2 runs. He died at Berwick-upon-Tweed in February 1905.

References

External links

1821 births
1905 deaths
People from Leith
Cricketers from Edinburgh
Gentlemen of Middlesex cricketers